Pernell Davis (born May 19, 1976) is a former American football defensive tackle who played in the National Football League (NFL) for the Philadelphia Eagles for one season. He attended West End High School in Birmingham, Alabama. He recorded 80 tackles and eight sacks as a junior, and earned all-state honors. He suffered an ankle injury during his senior year, which hampered him throughout the season. Despite this, he earned Parade All-America honors in 1995. Following graduation, he played college football for the University of Alabama at Birmingham on a scholarship.

Davis was drafted by the Eagles in the seventh round of the 1999 NFL Draft and played in two games for the team in 1999. He was allocated to the Frankfurt Galaxy of NFL Europa in 2000, but suffered a broken leg in the final regular season game against Berlin Thunder. Davis missed the entire 2000 season. He was released during final roster cuts prior to the 2001 season, but he was brought back on the Eagles' practice squad in December 2001. Davis played for the Scottish Claymores of NFL Europa in 2002, and was signed to a two-year contract by the Cincinnati Bengals in June 2002. He was waived by the Bengals in August 2002.

References

1976 births
Living people
Players of American football from Birmingham, Alabama
American football defensive tackles
UAB Blazers football players
Philadelphia Eagles players
Frankfurt Galaxy players
Scottish Claymores players